The Rabin fingerprinting scheme is a method for implementing fingerprints using polynomials over a finite field. It was proposed by Michael O. Rabin.

Scheme
Given an n-bit message m0,...,mn-1, we view it as a polynomial of degree n-1 over the finite field GF(2).

Applications

Many implementations of the Rabin–Karp algorithm internally use Rabin fingerprints.

The Low Bandwidth Network Filesystem (LBFS) from MIT uses Rabin fingerprints to implement variable size shift-resistant blocks.
The basic idea is that the filesystem computes the cryptographic hash of each block in a file.  To save on transfers between the client and server,
they compare their checksums and only transfer blocks whose checksums differ. But one problem with this scheme is that a single insertion at the beginning of the file will cause every checksum to change if fixed-sized (e.g. 4 KB) blocks are used. So the idea is to select blocks not based on a specific offset but rather by some property of the block contents. LBFS does this by sliding a 48 byte window over the file and computing the Rabin fingerprint of each window. When the low 13 bits of the fingerprint are zero LBFS calls those 48 bytes a breakpoint and ends the current block and begins a new one. This has the effect of shift-resistant variable size blocks. Any hash function could be used to divide a long file into blocks (as long as a cryptographic hash function is then used to find the checksum of each block): but the Rabin fingerprint is an efficient rolling hash, since the computation of the Rabin fingerprint of region B can reuse some of the computation of the Rabin fingerprint of region A when regions A and B overlap.

Note that this is a problem similar to that faced by rsync.

See also
W-shingling
Rolling hash

References

External links
 
 
 Ross N. Williams (1993). "A painless guide to CRC Error detection algorithms".

Theory of cryptography
Fingerprinting algorithms